Keep Talking is an American game show broadcast on CBS and ABC from the summer of 1958 to the spring of 1960. The show was hosted by Monty Hall, Carl Reiner and Merv Griffin.

Production
The show was a hosted panelist/game show produced by Wolf Productions and broadcast in the United States the summer of 1958, and in both the 1958-59 and the 1959-60 primetime television seasons, though on different days, times, and networks each season.

CBS broadcast the show on three different days in various timeslots:
 7:30-8 PM (EST) on Tuesdays from July 15, 1958 through October 1958, with Monty Hall as host
 10–10:30 PM (EST) on Sundays (November 1958 through February 1959) with Carl Reiner as host
 8–8:30 PM (EST) on Wednesdays (February 1959 through September 1959) with Carl Reiner as host.

During this CBS run, other celebrities, such as Vincent Price, filled in as host when needed.  These shows were filmed at CBS' Studio 51 in New York City.

The show moved to ABC for the 1959-60 season, filmed in the ABC Studios in California with Merv Griffin as host — the show was broadcast back on Tuesday again, but at a later time, 10:30-11 pm (EST).  The last show was broadcast May 3, 1960.

Format
Six celebrity panelists, divided into two teams, would try to guess a secret word given to one player on each team.  These two players would then proceed to tell a story to their team involving that word, yet not using that word.  Narration of the story would jump from team-mate to team-mate, often leaving the new narrator at a loss as to how to continue the story.  Little attention was paid to scoring and points—the point was for the panelists to build their ad-lib story seamlessly and entertainingly.

Stars
Among the panelists who appeared during the run of the show were:
 Morey Amsterdam
 Paul Winchell
 Peggy Cass
 Pat Carroll
 Orson Bean
 Joey Bishop
 Danny Dayton
 Ilka Chase (CBS run only)
 Elaine May (CBS run only)
 Audrey Meadows

References

External links
 

1958 American television series debuts
1960 American television series endings
1950s American game shows
1960s American game shows
American Broadcasting Company original programming
Black-and-white American television shows
CBS original programming
English-language television shows
Television shows filmed in New York (state)